Bad Wolves is an American heavy metal band formed in 2017. The band has three studio albums in its discography, Disobey (2018), N.A.T.I.O.N. (2019) and Dear Monsters (2021), though they have found more fame with their singles. Initially releasing a cover of the Cranberries' 1994 hit "Zombie", that was certified platinum in the US, the band proceeded to find further success with a number of songs topping the Billboard Mainstream Rock songs chart, including "Remember When", "Killing Me Slowly", and "Sober".

Discography

Studio albums

Extended plays
 False Flags, Volume One (2018)
 False Flags, Volume Two (2018)
 Zombie EP (2018)
 Sacred Kiss (2022)

Singles

Promotional singles

Music videos

References

Discographies of American artists